Cyril (Greek: Κύριλλος / Kyrillos; Serbian: Кирил / Kiril) was an Eastern Orthodox Metropolitan of Belgrade, from 1825 to 1827. Since Belgrade was capital city of the Principality of Serbia, Cyril was the most senior Eastern Orthodox hierarch in the country. He belonged to the hierarchy of the Patriarchate of Constantinople and previously served as the Metropolitan of Mesembria.

Biography
He was born in Kriva Palanka, in modern North Macedonia, and was educated in Constantinople. When the then Metropolitan of Belgrade Agathangelus was elected Metropolitan of Chalcedon in 1825, the Synod of Bishops in Constantinople elected Cyril as his successor in the Belgrade Diocese in August of the same year. The new Metropolitan of Belgrade cooperated closely with the Serbian Prince Miloš, but he was in poor health and died in Belgrade on 26 February 1827. In the same year, the Metropolitan Anthimus was elected in his place.

References

Literature 

 
 
 
 
 
 
 
 

1827 deaths
People from Kriva Palanka
Metropolitans of Belgrade
19th-century Eastern Orthodox bishops